Nicolene Pichapa Bunchu (born 22 September 1998), known professionally as Nicolene Limsnukan, is a Thai-American model and beauty pageant titleholder, who was crowned Miss Thailand World 2018. She represented Thailand at the Miss World 2018 pageant and was crowned Runner-Up and Continental Queen of Asia. In July 2022, Nicolene was announced as one of the top 30 finalist for Miss Universe Thailand 2022 and finished as 1st runner-up.

Pageantry

Miss Thai New Years USA 2014 
Limsnukan began her pageantry career in the Miss Thai New Years USA 2014 competition and won the title along with special awards for Miss Sport Outfit and Best Thai Costume.

Miss Teen Asia USA 2014 
Limsnukan represented Thailand in the Miss Teen Asia USA 2014 and won the title together with Miss Congeniality and Best National Costume Award.

Miss Universe Thailand 2018 
Limsnukan competed in Miss Universe Thailand 2018 and was placed in Top 10 and won People's Choice Award.

Miss Thailand World 2018 
Shortly after her time at the Miss Universe Thailand stage, Limsnukan joined the Miss Thailand World pageant, representing Bangkok in the Miss Thailand World 2018 competition, which she won the crown, and took Beauty With A Purpose Award, Best Thai Costume, Hua Hin's Favorite Award and Best Portrait. She succeeded outgoing Miss Thailand World 2016, Jinnita Buddee from Chiang Rai.

Miss World 2018 
Limsnukan represented Thailand at the Miss World 2018 competition in Sanya, China on December 8, 2018, where Manushi Chhillar of India crowned Vanessa Ponce of Mexico as her successor at the end of the event.

Limsnukan became Thailand's first ever Runner-up at the Miss World stage, marking Thailand's best performance in the pageant's history and ending a 26-year drought for the Continental Queen of Asia title. The last representative from Thailand to hold this title was Metinee Kingpayom at Miss World 1992.

References

1998 births
Living people
Miss World 2018 delegates
Female models from California
Nicolene Limsnukan
Nicolene Limsnukan
Nicolene Limsnukan
Nicolene Limsnukan
Nicolene Limsnukan
American people of Chinese descent
American people of Thai descent
People from Long Beach, California
Miss Thailand World
Miss Universe Thailand